"Serve the Ego" is a song by Jewel, released on September 24, 2002, as the fourth single from her album This Way. Unlike previous singles released by Jewel, it embarked new territory for the artist and a new fan base. By the time Jewel's third LP was released she stated that she had been getting into the club scene of LA. She was fascinated and intrigued by the music being played at the clubs in LA and NYC (house music). Jewel grew fond of the new genre she discovered and decided to release "Serve the Ego" to DJs for a remixing. This decision paid off, getting Jewel a number one single on the Billboard Club and Dance Charts within the US and single sales charts.

Release
The single was released exclusively for clubs. Some radio stations in San Francisco, New York City and Los Angeles, however, did play a shortened version of the single. The versions that were most played on the (dance) radio stations were the Mike Rizzo Radio Mix and the Wayne Rodriguez Radio Edit. A US-maxi single was issued for commercial purchase.

Music video
A video for "Serve the Ego" never surfaced. Jewel stated in an interview "There was an idea to shoot a video for Serve the Ego to one of the remixes, however, we later found that there wasn't enough time in my schedule to shoot one."

Commercial release
"Serve the Ego" was only released in the US. In the form of a maxi single, it contained eight different club mixes. The song was released in the US on September 24, 2002. The promo single was only issued to dance radio stations. Its limited release makes it a rare item in Jewel's discography.

Track listing
These are the formats and track listings of major single releases of "Serve the Ego".

US promo 12" single
A1. "Serve the Ego" [Album Edit]
A2. "Serve the Ego" [Mike Rizzo Radio Edit]
A3. "Serve the Ego" [Wayne Rodriguez Radio Edit]
B1. "Serve the Ego" [Mike Rizzo Club Mix]
B2. "Serve the Ego" [Wayne Rodriguez Club Mix]

US promo CD single
"Serve the Ego" [Mike Rizzo Radio Edit]
"Serve the Ego" [Wayne Rodriguez Radio Edit]
"Serve the Ego" [Album Edit]

US CD Maxi-single and US 12" single (both have exactly the same tracklist)
"Serve the Ego" [Hani Num Club Mix]
"Serve the Ego" [Mike Rizzo Club Mix]
"Serve the Ego" [Wayne Rodriguez Club Mix]
"Serve the Ego" [Gabriel & Dresden Club Mix]
"Serve the Ego" [Hani Num Dub]
"Serve the Ego" [Wayne Rodriguez Dub Mix]
"Serve the Ego" [Mike Rizzo Dub Mix]
"Serve the Ego" (Gabriel & Dresden Flashback)

UK 12" single
"Serve the Ego" [Hani Num Club Mix]
"Serve the Ego" [Gabriel & Dresden Club Mix]

Charts

See also
 List of number-one dance singles of 2002 (U.S.)

References

2002 singles
Jewel (singer) songs
Songs written by Jewel (singer)
Atlantic Records singles
Songs written by Itaal Shur